Preston Rural North is an electoral ward in the City of Preston, Lancashire, England.  The ward is the largest by area in the city, containing the smaller and smallest villages from the northern areas of Preston, from Woodplumpton bordering the M55 motorway junction at Broughton, to Beacon Fell at the border of the borough of Wyre.

Parishes
Unlike many other districts of Preston, the ward of Preston Rural North is parished, in that it has within it parish councils with their own structure and elected councillors. The parishes within Preston Rural North are Woodplumpton, Barton, Whittingham, and Goosnargh.

Current councillors

Demographics
At the most recent census in 2001, the electoral ward of Preston Rural North had a population of 6,540, increasing to 6,647 at the 2011 Census. Over 80% described themselves as Christian. Many of the people living in the wards and parishes rely on farming and agriculture for their living. At the 2007 Preston Council election, the electorate of the ward was 5,305.

Preston Rural North contains the former Whittingham Hospital, now ear-marked for renewal as a residential community. The ward forms, in conjunction with its neighbour Preston Rural East, the Preston Rural electoral division of Lancashire County Council.

References

Wards of Preston